Itahar High School (H.S.)is a school situated at Itahar, Uttar Dinajpur in West Bengal. It was founded in 1935. It is under the WBBSE & WBCHSE. There are science, arts & commerce course for class XI, XII.

Headmasters

School Uniform

Boys
Navy blue pant (half/full) and white shirt (half/full sleeve).

Girls
For class V-X, either 1) white shirt and sleeveless red frock or 2) white shirt and red skirt or 3) white salwar-kameez with red gauze scarf (odna). For class XI-XII, either 1) red blouse and white saree with red border (par) or 2) white salwar-kameez with red gauze scarf (odna).

Stream 
 Arts
 Science

Compulsory
English

Science
 Mathematics
 Physics
 Chemistry
 Biology

Arts 
 Geography
 Philosophy
 Computer Application
 Sanskrit
 History
 Political Science
 Sociology

Commerce
Economics

Cultural Program
"Kalpataru" is the annual magazine of this institute.

References

High schools and secondary schools in West Bengal
Schools in Uttar Dinajpur district
Educational institutions established in 1935
1935 establishments in India